Hindú Club is an Argentine sports club based in the Don Torcuato district of Greater Buenos Aires. The institution is mostly known for its rugby union team, which currently competes in the Top 12, the first division of the Unión de Rugby de Buenos Aires (URBA) league system. Hindú has become one of the most successful rugby teams of Argentina, having won 22 titles since 1996 to present days.

Apart from rugby, the club hosts other sports such as field hockey, football, futsal, tennis, gymnastics, golf and swimming.

History
In the 1910s, pupils of the La Salle college met to form a theatre group, then known as "Hindustánicos". After graduation, alumni would meet again and founded in 1919 a social, cultural and sporting venture known as the Hindú Club.

Its first location was in Pedro Echagüe street and only basketball was played there. Later the club would purchase an 83 hectare plot in Don Torcuato and start playing other sports, including rugby union for which Hindú Club is most famous today.

Hindú Club started playing rugby in 1935. However, the club had to wait until 1996 to win both its first URBA and Nacional titles. Since then, Hindú has become a powerhouse of Argentine rugby, winning several provincial and national titles.

Famous players include Argentina internationals Hernán Senillosa, Gonzalo Quesada, Nicolás Fernández Miranda, Juan Fernández Miranda, Lucas Ostiglia, Juan Ignacio Gauthier and Horacio Agulla.

Titles
Nacional de Clubes (11): 1996, 2001, 2003, 2005, 2010, 2015, 2016, 2017, 2018, 2019, 2022
Torneo de la URBA (11): 1996, 1998, 2006, 2007, 2008, 2009, 2012, 2014, 2015, 2017, 2022

References

External links

 

Multi-sport clubs in Argentina
Rugby union clubs in Buenos Aires Province
Rugby clubs established in 1919
Football clubs in Buenos Aires Province
Association football clubs established in 1919
Golf clubs and courses in Argentina
1919 establishments in Argentina